Anton Oleksandrovych Baydal (born 8 February 2000) is a professional Ukrainian football midfielder who plays for Mynai in the Ukrainian Premier League.

Career
Baydal is a product mainly of Azovstal Mariupol and Shakhtar Donetsk sportive school systems.

He made his début for FC Mariupol in the Ukrainian Premier League as a substituted player in the losing match against FC Shakhtar Donetsk on 25 August 2019.

References

External links
 

2000 births
Living people
Sportspeople from Mariupol
Ukrainian footballers
FC Mariupol players
FC Mynai players
Ukrainian Premier League players
Association football midfielders
21st-century Ukrainian people